Setebos  is one of the outermost retrograde irregular satellites of Uranus. It was discovered on 18 July 1999 by John J. Kavelaars et al. and provisionally designated S/1999 U 1.

Confirmed as Uranus XIX, it is named after the god worshipped by Caliban and Sycorax in William Shakespeare's play The Tempest.

The orbital parameters suggest that it may belong to the same dynamic cluster as Sycorax and Prospero, suggesting common origin. However, this suggestion does not appear to be supported by the observed colours. The satellite appears neutral (grey) in visible light (colour indices B-V=0.77, R-V=0.35), similar to Prospero but different from Sycorax (which is light red).

A crater on Umbriel is also named after Setebos, but with the spelling Setibos.

See also 

 Moons of Uranus
 Irregular satellites

References

External links 
 Setebos Profile (by NASA's Solar System Exploration)
 David Jewiit pages
 Uranus' Known Satellites (by Scott S. Sheppard)
 MPC: Natural Satellites Ephemeris Service

Moons of Uranus
Irregular satellites
 
19990718
Moons with a retrograde orbit